Edjailson Nascimento da Silva (born 9 October 1992), commonly known as Jailson, is a Brazilian footballer who plays as a attacking midfielder for Brusque.

References

External links
 

1992 births
Living people
Brazilian footballers
Brazilian expatriate footballers
Association football midfielders
Associação Atlética Santa Rita players
Agremiação Sportiva Arapiraquense players
Central Sport Club players
Moto Club de São Luís players
Fluminense de Feira Futebol Clube players
Cuiabá Esporte Clube players
ABC Futebol Clube players
Al-Tai FC players
Najran SC players
Campeonato Brasileiro Série B players
Campeonato Brasileiro Série C players
Campeonato Brasileiro Série D players
Saudi First Division League players
Expatriate footballers in Saudi Arabia
Brazilian expatriate sportspeople in Saudi Arabia